SeaHugger is a non-profit organization based in California, the United States. The organization preserves the marine environment from plastic pollution through educational activities.

Sea Hugger makes use of seabins provided by The Seabin Project to clean oceans.

History
Sea Hugger was founded by Shell Cleave. She has written a book, The Littlest Sea Hugger, describing the organization's role in cleaning the environment.

In 2019, Sea Hugger received Green Business Award.

In 2021, Shell Cleave received Jefferson Award for Public Service for her public service as part of Sea Hugger.

Sea Hugger is also working in South Africa and the United States.

Awards and recognition
 Green Business Award (2019)
 Jefferson Award for Public Service (2021)

References

Non-profit organizations based in California